Batangas City held its local elections on Monday, May 13, 2019, as a part of the 2019 Philippine general election. The voters will elect candidates for the elective local posts in the city: the mayor, vice mayor, the congressman (which will represent Batangas' fifth district which is composed of just the city), two provincial board members, and the 12 members of its city council.

Candidates

District Representative
Incumbent Marvey Mariño is running for reelection unopposed.

Provincial Board Members

|-

|-
|colspan=5 bgcolor=black|

|-

Mayor
Incumbent Mayor Beverley Rose Dimacuha is running for reelection unopposed.

Vice Mayor
Incumbent Emilio Francisco Berberabe, Jr. is running for reelection unopposed.

Councilors

Team EBD

|-bgcolor=black
|colspan=25|

2019 Philippine local elections
Elections in Batangas City
May 2019 events in the Philippines
2019 elections in Calabarzon